City of the Rising Sun is a 1998 South Korean film about two friends, Hong-ki and Do-chul in their mid twenties, struggling on life in the late 1990s Korean scenario. The film stars Jung Woo-sung as Do-chul and Lee Jung-jae as Hong-ki.

Storyline
Do-chul is a boxer who is forced to give up boxing due to his continuous series of losses. Jobless as he has given up the sport, he is introduced to a debt collecting agency where he meets and starts working with Hong-ki, a swindler, a con-artist. 
Hong-ki believes that he can do everything with money, and frequently sees himself winning the lottery of life. As a gambler, he frequently bets on horse racing and loses all the money he has. 
The two become friends soon after they meet, although Hong-ki's swindling eventually makes Do-chul to distrust Hong-ki and announce the end of their friendship. After a series of events that cause each one of them to lose everything they have, they become friends again and wish for a little hope watching the rising sun.

Cast
Jung Woo-sung as Do-chul
Lee Jung-jae as Hong-ki
Han Go-eun as Mimi
Lee Beom-soo as Byeong-guk
Park Ji-hun
Lee Ki-yeol
Han Sang-mi
Kim Young-ho as Boxing trainer
Lee Bong-gyu as Loan shark
Kim Tae-hwan

External links
 
 

1998 films
South Korean sports drama films
1990s sports drama films
South Korean boxing films
1998 drama films
1999 drama films
1999 films